Godlewski, Godlevsky, Hodlevskyi, or Hadleŭski is a surname with variants in multiple languages. Its Belarusian and Ukrainian forms are generally transcribed beginning with an 'h' but may also appear with a 'g'.

In Poland, the surname is most frequent in north-eastern areas.

People 
Antoni Szczęsny Godlewski, 1923–1944, soldier of the Home Army and participant in the Warsaw Uprising
Emil Godlewski (junior), 1875–1944, Polish embryologist
Emil Godlewski (senior), 1847–1930, Polish botanist
Ewa Malas-Godlewska (born 1957), Polish soprano
Józef Stefan Godlewski, 1894–1942, Polish writer who was imprisoned and died in the German concentration camp Auschwitz
Marek Godlewski, Polish footballer
Mario Godlewski, Canadian teacher, human rights activity, National Party candidate in 1993
Sarah Godlewski, born 1981, State Treasurer of Wisconsin
Vincent Hadleŭski or Wincenty Godlewski, 1898–1942, Belarusian Roman Catholic priest, publicist and politician
Zbigniew Godlewski, 18-year-old worker killed during the 1970 protests in Poland

References

See also
 

Polish-language surnames